Tomakivka Raion was a raion (district) of Dnipropetrovsk Oblast, southeastern-central Ukraine. Its administrative centre was located at the urban-type settlement of Tomakivka. The raion covered an area of 1200 square kilometres. The raion was abolished on 18 July 2020 as part of the administrative reform of Ukraine, which reduced the number of raions of Dnipropetrovsk Oblast to seven. The area of Tomakivka Raion was merged into Nikopol Raion.

At the time of disestablishment, the raion consisted of two hromadas:
 Myrove rural hromada with the administration in the settlement of Myrove;
 Tomakivka settlement hromada with the administration in Tomakivka.

References

External links
 
 

Former raions of Dnipropetrovsk Oblast
1923 establishments in Ukraine
Ukrainian raions abolished during the 2020 administrative reform